This is a list of electoral division results for the Australian 1955 federal election.

Overall
This section is an excerpt from 1955 Australian federal election § House of Representatives

New South Wales

Banks 
This section is an excerpt from Electoral results for the Division of Banks § 1955

Barton 
This section is an excerpt from Electoral results for the Division of Barton § 1955

Bennelong 
This section is an excerpt from Electoral results for the Division of Bennelong § 1955

Blaxland 
This section is an excerpt from Electoral results for the Division of Blaxland § 1955

Bradfield 
This section is an excerpt from Electoral results for the Division of Bradfield § 1955

Calare 
This section is an excerpt from Electoral results for the Division of Calare § 1955

Cowper 
This section is an excerpt from Electoral results for the Division of Cowper § 1955

Cunningham 
This section is an excerpt from Electoral results for the Division of Cunningham § 1955

Dalley 
This section is an excerpt from Electoral results for the Division of Dalley § 1955

Darling 
This section is an excerpt from Electoral results for the Division of Darling § 1955

East Sydney 
This section is an excerpt from Electoral results for the Division of East Sydney § 1955

Eden-Monaro 
This section is an excerpt from Electoral results for the Division of Eden-Monaro § 1955

Evans 
This section is an excerpt from Electoral results for the Division of Evans § 1955

Farrer 
This section is an excerpt from Electoral results for the Division of Farrer § 1955

Grayndler 
This section is an excerpt from Electoral results for the Division of Grayndler § 1955

Gwydir 
This section is an excerpt from Electoral results for the Division of Gwydir § 1955

Hughes 
This section is an excerpt from Electoral results for the Division of Hughes § 1955

Hume 
This section is an excerpt from Electoral results for the Division of Hume § 1955

Hunter 
This section is an excerpt from Electoral results for the Division of Hunter § 1955

Kingsford Smith 
This section is an excerpt from Electoral results for the Division of Kingsford Smith § 1955

Lang 
This section is an excerpt from Electoral results for the Division of Lang § 1955

Lawson 
This section is an excerpt from Electoral results for the Division of Lawson § 1955

Lowe 
This section is an excerpt from Electoral results for the Division of Lowe § 1955

Lyne 
This section is an excerpt from Electoral results for the Division of Lyne § 1955

Macarthur 
This section is an excerpt from Electoral results for the Division of Macarthur § 1955

Mackellar 
This section is an excerpt from Electoral results for the Division of Mackellar § 1955

Macquarie 
This section is an excerpt from Electoral results for the Division of Macquarie § 1955

Mitchell 
This section is an excerpt from Electoral results for the Division of Mitchell § 1955

New England 
This section is an excerpt from Electoral results for the Division of New England § 1955

Newcastle 
This section is an excerpt from Electoral results for the Division of Newcastle1955

North Sydney 
This section is an excerpt from Electoral results for the Division of North Sydney § 1955

Parkes 
This section is an excerpt from Electoral results for the Division of Parkes (1901–1969) § 1955

Parramatta 
This section is an excerpt from Electoral results for the Division of Parramatta § 1955

Paterson 
This section is an excerpt from Electoral results for the Division of Paterson § 1955

Phillip 
This section is an excerpt from Electoral results for the Division of Phillip § 1955

Reid
This section is an excerpt from Electoral results for the Division of Reid § 1955

Richmond 
This section is an excerpt from Electoral results for the Division of Richmond § 1955

Riverina 
This section is an excerpt from Electoral results for the Division of Riverina § 1955

Robertson 
This section is an excerpt from Electoral results for the Division of Robertson § 1955

Shortland 
This section is an excerpt from Electoral results for the Division of Shortland § 1955

St George 
This section is an excerpt from Electoral results for the Division of St George § 1955

Warringah 
This section is an excerpt from Electoral results for the Division of Warringah § 1955

Watson 
This section is an excerpt from Electoral results for the Division of Watson (1934–1969) § 1955

Wentworth 
This section is an excerpt from Electoral results for the Division of Wentworth § 1955

Werriwa 
This section is an excerpt from Electoral results for the Division of Werriwa § 1955

West Sydney 
This section is an excerpt from Electoral results for the Division of West Sydney § 1955

Victoria

Balaclava 
This section is an excerpt from Electoral results for the Division of Balaclava § 1955

Ballaarat 
This section is an excerpt from Electoral results for the Division of Ballarat § 1955

Batman 
This section is an excerpt from Electoral results for the Division of Batman § 1955

Bendigo 
This section is an excerpt from Electoral results for the Division of Bendigo § 1955

Bruce 
This section is an excerpt from Electoral results for the Division of Bruce § 1955

Chisholm 
This section is an excerpt from Electoral results for the Division of Chisholm § 1955

Corangamite 
This section is an excerpt from Electoral results for the Division of Corangamite § 1955

Corio 
This section is an excerpt from Electoral results for the Division of Corio § 1955

Darebin 
This section is an excerpt from Electoral results for the Division of Darebin § 1955

Deakin 
This section is an excerpt from Electoral results for the Division of Deakin § 1955

Fawkner 
This section is an excerpt from Electoral results for the Division of Fawkner § 1955

Flinders 
This section is an excerpt from Electoral results for the Division of Flinders § 1955

Gellibrand 
This section is an excerpt from Electoral results for the Division of Gellibrand § 1955

Gippsland 
This section is an excerpt from Electoral results for the Division of Gippsland § 1955

Henty 
This section is an excerpt from Electoral results for the Division of Henty § 1955

Higgins 
This section is an excerpt from Electoral results for the Division of Higgins § 1955

Higinbotham 
This section is an excerpt from Electoral results for the Division of Higinbotham § 1955

Indi 
This section is an excerpt from Electoral results for the Division of Indi § 1955

Isaacs 
This section is an excerpt from Electoral results for the Division of Isaacs (1949–1969) § 1955

Kooyong 
This section is an excerpt from Electoral results for the Division of Kooyong § 1955

La Trobe 
This section is an excerpt from Electoral results for the Division of La Trobe § 1955

Lalor 
This section is an excerpt from Electoral results for the Division of Lalor § 1955

Mallee 
This section is an excerpt from Electoral results for the Division of Mallee § 1955

Maribyrnong 
This section is an excerpt from Electoral results for the Division of Maribyrnong § 1955

McMillan 
This section is an excerpt from Electoral results for the Division of McMillan § 1955

Melbourne 
This section is an excerpt from Electoral results for the Division of Melbourne § 1955

Melbourne Ports 
This section is an excerpt from Electoral results for the Division of Melbourne Ports § 1955

Murray 
This section is an excerpt from Electoral results for the Division of Murray § 1955

Scullin 
This section is an excerpt from Electoral results for the Division of Scullin (1955–69) § 1955

Wannon 
This section is an excerpt from Electoral results for the Division of Wannon § 1955

Wills 
This section is an excerpt from Electoral results for the Division of Wills § 1955

Wimmera 
This section is an excerpt from Electoral results for the Division of Wimmera § 1955

Yarra 
This section is an excerpt from Electoral results for the Division of Yarra § 1955

Queensland

Bowman 
This section is an excerpt from Electoral results for the Division of Bowman § 1955

Brisbane 
This section is an excerpt from Electoral results for the Division of Brisbane § 1955

Capricornia 
This section is an excerpt from Electoral results for the Division of Capricornia § 1955

Darling Downs 
This section is an excerpt from Electoral results for the Division of Darling Downs § 1955

Dawson 
This section is an excerpt from Electoral results for the Division of Dawson § 1955

Fisher 
This section is an excerpt from Electoral results for the Division of Fisher § 1955

Griffith 
This section is an excerpt from Electoral results for the Division of Griffith § 1955

Herbert 
This section is an excerpt from Electoral results for the Division of Herbert § 1955

Kennedy 
This section is an excerpt from Electoral results for the Division of Kennedy § 1955

Leichhardt 
This section is an excerpt from Electoral results for the Division of Leichhardt § 1955

Lilley 
This section is an excerpt from Electoral results for the Division of Lilley § 1955

Maranoa 
This section is an excerpt from Electoral results for the Division of Maranoa § 1955

McPherson 
This section is an excerpt from Electoral results for the Division of McPherson § 1955

Moreton 
This section is an excerpt from Electoral results for the Division of Moreton § 1955

Oxley 
This section is an excerpt from Electoral results for the Division of Oxley § 1955

Petrie 
This section is an excerpt from Electoral results for the Division of Petrie § 1955

Ryan 
This section is an excerpt from Electoral results for the Division of Ryan § 1955

Wide Bay 
This section is an excerpt from Electoral results for the Division of Wide Bay § 1955

South Australia

Adelaide 
This section is an excerpt from Electoral results for the Division of Adelaide § 1955

Angas 
This section is an excerpt from Electoral results for the Division of Angas (1949–1977) § 1949

Barker 
This section is an excerpt from Electoral results for the Division of Barker § 1955

Bonython 
This section is an excerpt from Electoral results for the Division of Bonython § 1955

Boothby 
This section is an excerpt from Electoral results for the Division of Boothby § 1955

Grey 
This section is an excerpt from Electoral results for the Division of Grey § 1955

Hindmarsh 
This section is an excerpt from Electoral results for the Division of Hindmarsh § 1955

Kingston 
This section is an excerpt from Electoral results for the Division of Kingston § 1955

Port Adelaide 
This section is an excerpt from Electoral results for the Division of Port Adelaide § 1955

Sturt 
This section is an excerpt from Electoral results for the Division of Sturt § 1955

Wakefield 
This section is an excerpt from Electoral results for the Division of Wakefield § 1955

Western Australia

Canning 
This section is an excerpt from Electoral results for the Division of Canning § 1955

Curtin 
This section is an excerpt from Electoral results for the Division of Curtin § 1955

Forrest 
This section is an excerpt from Electoral results for the Division of Forrest § 1955

Fremantle 
This section is an excerpt from Electoral results for the Division of Fremantle § 1955

Kalgoorlie 
This section is an excerpt from Electoral results for the Division of Kalgoorlie § 1955

Moore 
This section is an excerpt from Electoral results for the Division of Moore § 1955

Perth 
This section is an excerpt from Electoral results for the Division of Perth § 1955

Stirling 
This section is an excerpt from Electoral results for the Division of Stirling § 1955

Swan 
This section is an excerpt from Electoral results for the Division of Swan § 1955

Tasmania

Bass 
This section is an excerpt from Electoral results for the Division of Bass § 1955

Braddon 
This section is an excerpt from Electoral results for the Division of Braddon § 1955

Denison 
This section is an excerpt from Electoral results for the Division of Denison § 1955

Franklin 
This section is an excerpt from Electoral results for the Division of Franklin § 1955

Wilmot 
This section is an excerpt from Electoral results for the Division of Wilmot § 1955

Territories

Australian Capital Territory 
This section is an excerpt from Electoral results for the Division of Australian Capital Territory § 1955

Northern Territory 
This section is an excerpt from Electoral results for the Division of Northern Territory § 1955

See also 

 Candidates of the 1955 Australian federal election
 Members of the Australian House of Representatives, 1955–1958

References 

House of Representatives 1955